This article contains a list of notable people who were born or lived a significant amount of time in Pittsburgh, Pennsylvania. The city of Pittsburgh is the second-largest city and the center of the second largest metro area in the U.S. Commonwealth of Pennsylvania.

Artists

Actresses

 Tina Benko
 Julie Benz 
 Lori Cardille 
 Caitlin Clarke 
 Dolores Costello 
 Marpessa Dawn
 Barbara Feldon
 Rita Gam 
 Elizabeth Hartman
 Gillian Jacobs
 Cherie Johnson
 Kimmarie Johnson 
 Shirley Jones
 Lorelei King 
 Christine Laitta
 Heather Mazur 
 Mitzi McCall
 Judith McConnell
 Anisha Nagarajan
 Evelyn Nesbit
 Sandra Dee Robinson
 Margot Rose 
 Zelda Rubinstein
 Lillian Russell
 Rena Sofer 
 Sam Sorbo
 Maddie Ziegler
 Lisa Emery

Actors

 F. Murray Abraham
 Tom Atkins
 Carl Betz 
 Christian Borle
 Don Brockett
 Steve Byrne
 Ted Cassidy
 David Conrad
 Maurice Costello
 Rusty Cundieff 
 John Davidson
 Jack Dodson
 Charles Esten
 Joe Flaherty 
 Scott Glenn
 Jeff Goldblum 
 Frank Gorshin
 Charles Grodin
 Kevin Peter Hall 
 John Hodiak
 Michael Keaton 
 Gene Kelly
 John Leslie
 Tom Major-Ball
 Joe Manganiello
 Jim Martin
 Kiel Martin 
 Adolphe Menjou
 Kermit Murdock
 Burt Mustin
 Manu Narayan
 Bill Nunn
 Michael Park
 Billy Porter
 William Powell
 Zachary Quinto
 Fred Rogers
 Johnny Sins
 Regis Toomey
 Fritz Weaver
 Patrick Fabian

Comedians

 Marty Allen
 Steve Byrne
 Patti Deutsch
 Billy Gardell
 Eddie Ifft
 Anthony Jeselnik
 Jesse Joyce
 Mario Joyner 
 Maxine Lapiduss 
 Dennis Miller 
 Frank Nicotero

Reporters and anchors

 Jodi Applegate – NBC's Later Today
 John Buccigross – host, SportsCenter on ESPN
 Bill Burns – KDKA anchor (1953–1989)
 Patti Burns – KDKA anchor with her father Bill
 Bill Cardille – broadcaster known as Chilly Billy, host of Chiller Theatre and Studio Wrestling
 Beano Cook – ESPN college football analyst
 Myron Cope – sports journalist, radio personality, and sportscaster
 Scott Ferrall – sports talk radio host
 Howard Fineman – Newsweek journalist
 Fred Honsberger – broadcaster
 Sue Kerr - LGBTQ writer
 Jay Mariotti  – sportswriter
 Jeanne Moos – CNN reporter
 Art Pallan – broadcaster
 Jane Pauley
 Jim Quinn – radio talk show host
 Martha Rial - 1998 Pulitzer Prize for Spot News Photography
 Rick Sebak - WQED documentarian
 Paul Shannon – host of WTAE-TV children's show Adventure Time
 John Stehr – anchorman at WTHR in Indianapolis, Indiana
 Bari Weiss – opinion writer and editor

Media personalities

 Porky Chedwick – announcer
 Foo Conner - journalist
 Rege Cordic – actor and broadcaster
 Bill Cullen – TV game show host
 John Dennis – radio host
 Frank DiLeo – Michael Jackson's manager, Goodfellas cast member
 Phil Frank – cartoonist
 Chris Garver – tattoo artist, Miami Ink
 Justine Ezarik (aka. iJustine) – YouTube personality
 Rafe Judkins – Survivor: Guatemala
 Sarah Kozer – Joe Millionaire
 Billy Mays – television direct-response advertisement salesperson
 Sheena Monnin – Miss Pennsylvania
 Jenna Morasca – reality show contestant, winner of Survivor: The Amazon
 Sharon Needles – drag queen, winner of season four of RuPaul's Drag Race
 David Newell – TV actor, "Mr. McFeely" on Mister Rogers' Neighborhood
 Beth Ostrosky – model, TV personality, wife of Howard Stern
 Bob Trow – TV actor, "Bob Dog" and "Robert Troll" on Mister Rogers' Neighborhood
 Ricki Wertz – WTAE-TV

Producers, directors, and effects

 Antoine Fuqua – director
 John P. Harris – invented the first movie theater
 David Hollander – TV and movie producer, director
 Carl Kurlander – film producer, writer
 Sally Lapiduss – producer
 Rob Marshall – director, Chicago
 Greg Nicotero – actor, director, producer, special effects and makeup artist The Walking Dead
 Eric Red – screenwriter and director
 Ford Riley – producer, screenwriter and lyricist; created The Lion Guard
 George A. Romero – director, best known for Night of the Living Dead
 Richard Rossi – director
 Tom Savini – actor, stunt man, director, special effects and makeup artist
 Lou Scheimer – animator, voice actor, co-founder of animation studio Filmation
 David O. Selznick – film producer, Gone with the Wind
 Lewis J. Selznick – film producer
 Myron Selznick – producer, talent agency head

 Tim Kaiser - producer, Seinfeld, Will & Grace, 2 Broke Girls]

Music

Jazz, soul, R&B, and gospel

 Ron Affif – jazz guitarist
 Ron Anthony – jazz guitarist, teacher; Sinatra's guitarist for 10 years
 Bob Babbitt – bass player for Motown house band the Funk Brothers
 Sheryl Bailey – jazz guitarist
 George Benson – jazz guitarist, singer
 Harold Betters – jazz trombonist
 Art Blakey – jazz drummer, bandleader
 Ray Brown – jazz double bassist
 Paul Chambers – bass player
 Sonny Clark – jazz pianist
 Kenny Clarke – jazz drummer
 Johnny Costa – jazz pianist
 Frank Cunimondo – jazz pianist
 Johnny Daye – soul singer
 Billy Eckstine – singer
 Roy Eldridge – trumpeter
 Joel Forrester – pianist
 Barry Galbraith – jazz guitarist
 Erroll Garner – jazz pianist
 Walt Harper – jazz pianist
 Earl Hines – jazz pianist
 Roger Humphries – drummer
 Phyllis Hyman – singer
 Ahmad Jamal – jazz pianist
 Eddie Jefferson – singer, composer; wrote the lyrics to "Moody's Mood for Love"
 Dodo Marmarosa – be-bop pianist
 Billy May – bandleader, arranger for Frank Sinatra 
 Sammy Nestico – arranger for Count Basie Orchestra 
 Leo Pellegrino – baritone saxophonist
 Horace Parlan – pianist
 Jimmy Ponder – guitarist
 Billy Price – singer
 Eddie Safranski – bassist
 Shanice
 Dakota Staton – vocalist
 Billy Strayhorn – composer, pianist
 Maxine Sullivan – jazz vocalist
 Stanley Turrentine – tenor saxophone player
 Tommy Turrentine – trumpeter
 Mary Lou Williams – jazz pianist
 Spanky Wilson – jazz vocalist

Classics and standards

 Lory Bianco – singer
 Jackie Evancho – singer
 Colyn Fischer  – fiddler
 Stephen Foster – 19th-century songwriter
 Philip Glass – composer
 Byron Janis – pianist
 Oscar Levant – pianist
 Lorenzo Malfatti – Italian opera coach
 Mary Lou Metzger – singer
 Mildred Miller – opera singer
 Joe Negri – musician, professor, best known as "Handyman Negri" on Mister Rogers' Neighborhood
 Leo Robin – lyricist

Rock and alternative

 Tunde Adebimpe – musician and actor, lead singer of TV on the Radio
 Bobby Blotzer – drummer for Ratt
 Ceann – Irish drinking music rock band
 William Fitzsimmons – musician
 Gregg Gillis – musician, "Girl Talk"
 Gramsci Melodic – alternative rock band
 Joe Grushecky – Iron City Houserockers, solo artist; worked with Bruce Springsteen
 Donnie Iris – musician
 Ray Luzier – Korn member
 Weird Paul Petroskey – lo-fi musician
 Justin Sane – lead guitarist and co-singer/songwriter of the political punk rock band Anti-Flag
 Spike Slawson – singer for Me First and the Gimme Gimmes

Classical

 Victor Herbert

Country and folk

 Eric Andersen
 Bill Deasy 
 Guaranteed Irish (band)

Pop

 Michele Brourman – composer 
 Lou Christie – pop singer, "Lightning Strikes"
 Daya – pop singer/songwriter
 Jerry Fielding – Oscar-nominated composer
 Chris Jamison – singer-songwriter, musician, and contestant from NBC's The Voice season 7
 The Marcels – vocal group, "Blue Moon"
 B. E. Taylor – musician
 Bobby Vinton – pop singer, "Blue Velvet"
 Brian Young – drummer and percussionist, Fountains of Wayne

Rap and hip-hop

 Beedie – Rapper
 Grand Buffet – Rap duo
 Jasiri X – Artist, Activist, Rapper, Entrepreneur
 Jero
 Jimmy Wopo – Rapper
 Lady Miss Kier – Deee-Lite
 Mel-Man – hip hop producer and rapper
 Pittsburgh Slim – Rapper
 Wiz Khalifa
 Mac Miller – Rapper
 Chevy Woods – Rapper

Dancers and choreographers

 Kyle Abraham – choreographer
 Martha Graham – dancer and choreographer; awarded Presidential Medal of Freedom
 Billy Hartung – Broadway actor, dancer and singer
 Gene Kelly – iconic Hollywood dancer, actor, singer, director, and choreographer
 Abby Lee Miller – former dance studio owner, choreographer and team coach for Abby Lee Dance Company; featured on TV show Dance Moms
 Chloe Lukasiak – actress and former featured dancer on TV show Dance Moms 
 Paul Taylor – choreographer
 Jonathan Wolken (1949–2010) – founder of the Pilobolus dance company
 Maddie Ziegler – actress and former featured dancer on TV show Dance Moms

Visual arts

 Matt Baker – comic book artist
 Romare Bearden 
 Martin Beck – painter
 Seddon Bennington 
 Sharif Bey – sculptor, ceramist, educator
 Ailsa Mellon Bruce – Mellon heir and art patron
 Norman Daly — visual artist
 Vanessa German – sculptor, poet 
 David Hanna – artist
 Charles "Teenie" Harris – photographer
 Jerry Harris – sculptor
 Yvonne Jacquette – painter and printmaker
 Michael Lotenero – painter and sculptor 
 Scott McDaniel – comic book artist
 James Michalopoulos – painter and sculptor
 Burton Morris – artist
 Thaddeus Mosley – sculptor
 Sharon Needles – drag queen, winner of RuPaul's Drag Race season 4
 Jackie Ormes
 Philip Pearlstein – painter
 Sara Penn – designer and curator
 Robert Qualters – painter
 Lawrence Saint – stained glass artist
 Naomi Sims – model
 George Sotter – painter
 Renee Stout – multi-media artist
 Andy Warhol – painter
 Julia Warhola

Authors

 Joseph Bathanti – poet, writer, professor; NC Poet Laureate, 2012–2014
 Nellie Bly  – Pulitzer Prize-winning investigative journalist and writer
 Kenneth Burke  – literary theorist
 Willa Cather – author, Pulitzer Prize winner
 Michael Chabon – Pulitzer Prize-winning author
 Murray Chass – New York Times baseball writer, author
 Stephen Chbosky – author
 Malcolm Cowley – poet, critic
 Melanie Craft – novelist; wife of Larry Ellison of Oracle
 Stephen Dau – writer
 Annie Dillard – author and Pulitzer Prize winner
 Harry Dolan – writer
 Zak Ebrahim – Author, Peace Activist, Public Speaker
 Jack Gilbert  – poet
 Lester Goran – writer and professor
 Beth Gylys – poet and professor
 George Heard Hamilton – art historian
 Kerry Hannon – author
 Samuel Hazo – poet and professor
 Lori Jakiela – author
 George S. Kaufman – humorist, playwright
 Joseph Koerner – art historian
 David Leavitt – novelist
 Stephen Manes – magazine writer, author
 David McCullough – historian and author and two-time Pulitzer Prize winner
 Burton Morris – painter
 Elizabeth Moorhead – novelist
 Stewart O'Nan – author
 Peter Oresick – poet
 Mary Roberts Rinehart –  mystery writer
 Gladys Schmitt – writer
 Jim Shooter – comic book writer, editor and publisher
 Michael Simms – poet in Pittsburgh since 1987
 George Smith – gambler, handicapper
 Gertrude Stein – writer, poet, playwright, and feminist
 Gerald Stern – poet
 Kathleen Tessaro – novelist
 John Edgar Wideman – author and professor
 August Wilson – Pulitzer Prize-winning playwright
 Damon Young - author and columnist

Athletes

Baseball

 Glenn Beckert – second baseman
 Buddy Bell – third baseman (1972–89)
 Bill Blair
 Dave Bush
 Ollie Carnegie – 1931–45
 Betty Jane Cornett (1932–2006) – third base (1950–1952) All-American Girls Professional Baseball League
 Bill Doak – Cardinals and Dodgers, inventor of the modern baseball glove
 Ryan Garko – first baseman Giants
 Josh Gibson – Negro league player, Pittsburgh Crawfords and Homestead Grays
 Gary Green 
 Howdy Groskloss – shortstop 1930–32
 Ian Happ – Chicago Cubs
 Art Howe – managed Astros and A's
 Derek Law pitcher
 Bobby Lowe – first MLB player with 4 home runs in a game
 Heinie Smith
 Sam McDowell
 Marguerite Pearson – utility player 1948–1954, All-American Girls Professional Baseball League
 Trent Thornton – pitcher for the Toronto Blue Jays
 Harold Joseph "Pie" Traynor – Pirates Hall of Fame member
 Honus Wagner – shortstop, Hall of Fame member
 Neil Walker – Former MLB second baseman
 Bobby Wallace – Hall of Fame inductee 
 John Wehner – Pirates infielder, broadcaster
 Josh Wilson – 2005–present

Baseball contributors

 Bill Benswanger – Pirates owner, vocal advocate for integration
 Chuck Greenberg – Rangers former owner
 Gus Greenlee – Crawfords founder
 John P. Harris – Boston Braves owner
 Ray Kennedy – scout and GM
 Tony LaCava – longtime scout and assistant general manager

Basketball

Coaches

 Dick Bennett – Wisconsin, Washington State 1976–2006
 Paul Birch 
 Eddie Cameron – Duke 1929–49 until 1972, Cameron Indoor Stadium, founding member of the ACC, football coach and Olympic selector
 Suzie McConnell-Serio – WNBA player 1998–2000, head coach 2004–06, Duquesne 2007–2013
 Dudey Moore 
 Skip Prosser – Loyola (MD), Xavier, and Wake Forest 1993–2007
 Herb Sendek – NC State and Arizona State 1994–2015

Forwards and centers

 John Abramovic – 1946–48
 DeJuan Blair – Pitt All-American, Spurs 2009–13, Mavericks 2013–
 Chuck Cooper – 1950–56; first drafted African-American
Jakim Donaldson (born 1983) – player in the Israeli Basketball Premier League
 Ken Durrett – 1971–75 NBA
 Paul Grant – 1997–2004
 Maurice Lucas – 1975–88
 Walt Miller – 1946–47
 Maurice Stokes – Rochester/Cincinnati Royals 1955–58; Hall of Famer
 Walt Szczerbiak – 1971–72 NBA
Michael Young (born 1994) – Ironi Nahariya of the Israeli Basketball Premier League

Guards

 Moe Barr – 1970–71 NBA
 Paul Birch 
 Ron Carter – 1978–80 NBA
 Calvin Fowler – 1969–70
 DeAndre Kane 
 T. J. McConnell – Arizona Wildcats and Philadelphia 76er and Indiana Pacers 
 Jack Twyman – 1955–66, Hall of Famer

Basketball contributors

 Mark Cuban – Mavericks owner
 Tim Grgurich – Pitt coach
 Ted Stepien – Cavs former owner

Boxing

 Bob Baker – heavyweight contender
 Eddie Chambers – Heavyweight and Cruiserweight Contender, 2008–2016
 Billy Conn – light-heavyweight champ 1939–41
 Andy DePaul – middleweight contender, referee
 Harry Greb – middleweight champ 1923
 Frank Klaus – middleweight champ 1904
 Paul Spadafora – lightweight champ, 1999
 Jackie Wilson – featherweight champ, early 1900s (decade)
 Teddy Yarosz – middleweight champ, 1934
 Charley Zivic (Affif) - middleweight contender
 Fritzie Zivic – welterweight champ, 1940

Figure skating

 Michael Seibert – five-time gold medalist at U.S. Figure Skating Championships; three bronze medals at World Championships
 Jamie Silverstein – ice dancing
 Taylor Toth – pairs skating

Football

Coaches: primarily NFL

 Joe Bugel – assistant and head coach 1975–present; founder of the "Hogs" of the 1980s
 Jim Haslett – head coach Saints (2000–2005), Rams D.C. (2006–08)
 Mike McCarthy – Packers head coach 2005–2018
 Herb McCracken – college 1920s and 1930s
 Mike Miller – assistant 1999–present
 Dick Nolan – head coach, San Francisco 49ers and New Orleans Saints

Coaches: other football

 Frank Cignetti, Jr. – University of Pittsburgh
 Tom Davies – 1922–47
 Rich Lackner – Carnegie Mellon 1986–present

Quarterbacks

 Joe Namath – New York Jets, Alabama Crimson Tide National Champion
 Marc Bulger – 2000–2011, Super Bowl
 Chuck Fusina – NFL 1979–86
 Bruce Gradkowski – Steelers, Bucs, Raiders 2006–16
 Major Harris – record-setter in college and CFL
 Leon Hart – Heisman Trophy, College Hall of Fame
 Al Jacks – quarterback Penn State and college head coach
 Jim Kelly – 1986–96, Hall of Fame, 4 Super Bowl appearances
 Dan Marino – 1983–99, Hall of Fame 1 Super Bowl appearance
 Mike McMahon – NFL, CFL, UFL quarterback 2001–2012
 Rod Rutherford – NFL quarterback 2004–2006 and college coach 
 Matt Schaub – NFL quarterback 2004–2020
 Johnny Unitas – 1956–73, Hall of Famer, two Super Bowls
 Alex Van Pelt – 1995–2003
 Scott Zolak – 1991–99 1 Super Bowl appearance

Running backs

 Tony Dorsett – NFL, HOF, Dallas Cowboys, University of Pittsburgh
 Kevan Barlow – NFL running back 2001–2007
 Cookie Gilchrist – AFL and CFL
 Warren Heller – NFL halfback 1930s
 William F. Knox – Yale and Carnegie Tech halfback
 Roger Kochman – 1963
 Curtis Martin – 1995–2006, Super Bowl
 Harry McChesney – 1900s (decade) NFL
 Eugene "Mercury" Morris – 70s Dolphins; two Super Bowls
 Vinnie Sunseri – NFL player and coach
 Ray Zellars – Saints

Receivers and tight ends

 Brian Baschnagel – originally a running back, Ohio State, Bears 1976–1984
 Darnell Dinkins – NFL tight end in the 1990s and 2000s (decade)
 John Frank – NFL tight end in the 1980s
 Gregg Garrity – Penn State, NFL 1983–89
 Ken Herock – NFL tight end 1963–69, Super Bowl
 Brandon Marshall – NFL wide receiver 2006–2018
 Rasheed Marshall – NFL wide receiver 2005–2007
 Joel Williams – NFL tight end, 1987

Offensive linemen

 Adam Bisnowaty – NFL offensive linesman for the New York Giants
 Dean Caliguire – NFL lineman in 1991
 Bill Fralic – offensive lineman for Atlanta Falcons, '80s All-Decade Team
 Gary Greaves –  tackle 1960
 Leander Jordan – offensive lineman Carolina Panthers, San Diego Chargers, Atlanta Falcons, Jacksonville Jaguars
 Mose Lantz – NFL center 1933
 William R. Moore – NFL guard in the 1940s
 Bull Polisky NFL guard 1929
 Tom Ricketts – NFL tackle 1980s and 1990s
 Mike Rosenthal – NFL tackle 1999–2007
 Jack Sack – NFL guard in the 1920s

Defensive linemen

 Mike Barnes – Pro bowler 1973–1981
 Bob Buczkowski – NFL defensive end in the 1980s
 Sam Clancy – NFL defensive end in the 1980s and 1990s
 Ave Daniell – NFL tackle in the 1930s
 Aaron Donald – NFL defensive tackle
 Jack Dugger – NFL lineman 1946–49
 Art Gob – NFL defensive end, 1950s and 1960s
 Cameron Heyward – NFL 2011–present
 Tyrique Jarrett – NFL defensive tackle
 David Logan – defensive tackle 1970s and 1980s
 Leo Skladany – NFL defensive end 1940s and 1950s
 Jason Taylor – defensive end; five-time Pro Bowler for Miami Dolphins
 Randy White – defensive lineman 1975–88; three Super Bowls, Hall of Fame

Defensive backs and linebackers

 LaVar Arrington – NFL linebacker 2000–2006
 Jack Butler – cornerback 1951–59, Pro Football Hall of Fame
 Jim Flanigan Sr. – NFL linebacker 1960s and 1970s
 Don Graham Penn State, NFL 1987–89
 Bobby Grier Pitt Panthers 1952-1956, Hall of Famer, civil rights icon
 Justin King – NFL 2008–2012
 Nick Kwiatkoski – linebacker for the Atlanta Falcons
 Sean Lee – former linebacker for Dallas Cowboys
 Mike Logan – NFL safety 1996–2006, Super Bowl
 Paul Martha  –  NFL safety in the 1960s
 Dick McCabe – NFL safety in the 1950s and 1960s
 Ryan Mundy – NFL safety
 Paul Posluszny – Dick Butkus Award winner from Penn State, linebacker for Buffalo Bills
 Scott Radecic – Penn State and NFL linebacker 1984–95
 Bryant Salter –  NFL safety in the 1970s
 Joe Schmidt – linebacker 1953–65, Hall of Fame
 Raymond Ventrone – safety, Cleveland Browns
 Eric Wicks – safety, finalist for Bronko Nagurski Award in 2007

Football specialists

 Pat McAfee – All Pro NFL punter, 2010’s all decade team
 Don Silvestri – kicker in the 1990s

Football contributors

 Dave Berry – pro football pioneer
 Kevin Colbert – director of football operations (2 Super Bowls)
 Dale Hamer – NFL referee 1978–2001, 3 Super Bowls
 Shaun Herock – NFL executive
 Bill Nunn – Steelers scout since 1967
 Art Rooney – owner and founder of Pittsburgh Steelers Duquesne University
 Dan Rooney – second chairman of the Pittsburgh Steelers, member of the Pro Football Hall of Fame

Golf

 Scott Dunlap – PGA and Champions Tour
 Bob Friend – PGA and Nationwide Tour
 Jim Simons – as an amateur nearly won 1971 U.S. Open; first tournament winner using a metal driver
 Brendon Todd – PGA Tour

Hockey

Centers and wingers

 Riley Barber – Capitals winger, 2017–
 Ryan Malone – Penguins, Lightning, Rangers winger 2003–15; 2017
 Gerry O'Flaherty – Leafs, Canucks, Flames 1971–79
 Brandon Saad – Colorado Avalanche winger 2011–
 Henrik Samuelsson – Coyotes winger  2014–
 William Thomas – Anyang Halla winger 2005–
 Vincent Trocheck – Panthers 2014–2020, Hurricanes 2020–2022, Rangers 2022–
 R. J. Umberger – Flyers, Jackets center 2005–

Defense

 Matt Bartkowski – Iowa Wild 
 Bob Beers – Bruins, Lightning, Oilers, Islanders defenseman 1989–97
 Dylan Reese – Rangers, Islanders, Penguins 2007–
 Mike Weber – former NHL defenseman.

Goalies

 John Gibson – player for Anaheim Ducks

Hockey contributors

 James Wallace Conant – managed Duquesne Gardens

Motorsports
 Chip Ganassi – former driver, now team owner in IndyCar and NASCAR
 Dick Linder –  1950s NASCAR driver

Olympic sports

 Kurt Angle – 1996 gold medalist in freestyle wrestling, later became a professional wrestler
 Robert "Bob" Blum (born 1928), Olympic fencer
 Herb Douglas – long jump bronze medalist at 1948 Summer Olympics; inducted into Pennsylvania Sports Hall of Fame 1992
 Jake Herbert – folkstyle and freestyle wrestler, 2009 World silver medalist, represented USA at 2012 Summer Olympics
 Suzie McConnell-Serio – basketball 1988 and 1992
 Allison Schmitt – competitive swimmer, four time Olympian
 Leah Smith – swimming, gold and bronze medalist in 2016 Olympics
 Amanda Polk – rowing, gold medalist W8+ in 2016 Olympics

Soccer

 Meghan Klingenberg – player for the Portland Thorns FC and United States women's national soccer team
 A. J. Wood – MLS player
 Marvell Wynne II

Tennis

 Bjorn Fratangelo – French Open boys' champion
 Bonnie Gadusek – pro tennis player, reached U.S. Open quarterfinals
 Gretchen Magers – reached Wimbledon and French Open quarterfinals
 Alison Riske – WTA player, reached 4th round of U.S. Open

Professional wrestling

 Kurt Angle – WWE/TNA wrestler and Olympic gold medalist
 Rob Conway – WWE wrestler on RAW brand
 Johnny De Fazio – known as "Jumping" Johnny De Fazio
 Dominic DeNucci – WWWF wrestler and trainer
 Shane Douglas – ECW, WCW, and WWF  wrestler
 Britt Baker - AEW wrestler
 Corey Graves – wrestler, WWE commentator
 Mike Jones – known as Virgil in WWE; worked as Vincent, Shane and Curly Bill in WCW
 Cody Michaels – former USWA tag team champion, ECW, WSX producer
 John Minton – WWF aka Big John Studd
 Jeffrey Sciullo – WWE wrestler known as Ezekiel (formerly Elias (Samson))
 Bruno Sammartino – two-time World Wide Wrestling Federation champion
 Mike Scicluna – known as Baron Mikel Scicluna
 John Sullivan – known as Johnny Valiant
 Newton Tattrie – known as Geeto Mongol
 Larry Zbyszko (real name Larry Whistler) – director of authority on Total Nonstop Action Wrestling

Other sports

 Danny Chew – cyclist, winner of Race Across America (1996, 1999)
 Joseph Kearney – athletic administrator
 George Smith – horse racing 
 Tom Wallisch – professional skier

Industry

Aviation

 Paige Kassalen – electrical engineer on Solar Impulse
 Willard Rockwell – formed Rockwell Intl.
 Calbraith Perry Rodgers – made the first transcontinental flight

Steel and metals 

 James W. Brown – Crucible Steel
 Andrew Carnegie – steel tycoon and philanthropist, founded what became U.S. Steel
 William Donner – steel tycoon, founded Monessen and Donora, daughter married FDR's son in 1932
 George Washington Gale Ferris Jr. – steel engineer, businessman and inventor of the Ferris wheel
 Henry Clay Frick – steel tycoon, chief operation officer of what became U.S. Steel
 Charles Martin Hall – aluminum producer and founder of Alcoa
 Julian Kennedy – mechanical engineer in steel 
 George Lauder – Scottish-American billionaire industrialist; partner in the Carnegie Steel Company; board member of U.S. Steel; cousin-brother of Andrew Carnegie
 James H. Laughlin – Jones & Laughlin Steel
 John Leishman – executive at Carnegie Steel
 William Metcalf – Fort Pitt foundry
 Charles M. Schwab – founder of Bethlehem Steel 
 John P. Surma – U.S. Steel
 Thomas Usher – CEO of U.S. Steel and chairman of the board of Marathon Oil
 John Walker – iron and steel industrialist

Energy 

 Walter Arnheim – Mobil executive and corporate and non-profit advisor
 Frederick Bausman 
 E. W. Marland – oilman, founded what would become Conoco, also became the governor of Oklahoma
 William Mellon – co-founded Gulf Oil

Transport 

 Erik Buell – Buell Motorcycle Company
 Alexander Cassatt – Pennsylvania Railroad
 Louis Semple Clarke – steamboats
 John E. Connelly – Gateway Clipper Fleet
 Mike Fink – river boatman
 Robert Pitcairn – Pennsylvania Railroad
 Samuel Rea – Pennsylvania Railroad

Finance 

 John F. Donahue – chairman, Federated Investors
 Stanley Druckenmiller – hedge fund manager
 Thomas Marshall Howe – 19th-century politician
 Richard B. Mellon – banker, philanthropist
 Thomas Mellon – founded Mellon Financial
 David Tepper – businessman, hedge fund manager, philanthropist, and owner of the Carolina Panthers
 William Thaw – 19th-century banker
 James Lindenberg – founder of ABS-CBN Corporation

Technology and communications 

 Luis von Ahn - CAPTCHA inventor, Duolingo Founder
 William Bullock – printing press innovator
 Charlie Cheever – co-founder of Quora
 Brendan Eich – Mozilla, creator of JavaScript
 Caterina Fake – co-founder of Flickr and Hunch
 John P. Harris – theater owner
 Regis McKenna – high technology marketing guru
 Willard Rockwell – pioneer of Rockwell Intl.
 Richard Mellon Scaife – Tribune-Review
 Rich Skrenta – computer programmer
 George Westinghouse – electrical industry pioneer
 Mark Whitaker – CNN Worldwide chief
 Jamie Zawinski – hacker

Consumer goods 

 Peter Chartier (Chartiers Town and Tarentum) – fur trader 1734–43
 David L. Clark
 H. J. Heinz II – CEO of H.J. Heinz Co.
 Henry J. Heinz – founder of H. J. Heinz Company
 Edgar J. Kaufmann – Kaufmann's
 Billy Mays – TV pitchman
 James Sinegal – Costco
 Patricia A. Woertz – ADM

Other industries 

 William D. Boyce – founder of Boy Scouts of America
 Dr. Herbert Boyer – co-founder of Genentech
 John Baptiste Ford – PPG Industries
 Ed Grier – Disneyland
 Joseph A. Hardy III – 84 Lumber
 Bob Stupak – Vegas Stratosphere

Labor

 David J. McDonald – president of steelworkers union
 Theodore Schaffer – president of the Amalgamated Association of Iron, Steel, and Tin Workers
 Fannie Sellins – union organizer
 Joseph Yablonski – UMW
 Joseph "Chip" Yablonski – UMW attorney
 Kenneth Yablonski – attorney

Religion

Catherine Anne Cesnik (1942–1969), Catholic nun who was murdered
 Cardinal Daniel DiNardo – archbishop of Galveston-Houston
 Thomas Dolinay – archbishop
 Joseph R. Lamonde
 Cardinal Adam Maida – Emeritus Archbishop of Detroit
 Janice McLaughlin – Catholic nun and human rights activist
 Madalyn Murray O'Hair – founder of American Atheists
 William Passavant
 George Rapp – founder of the religious sect Harmonists
 Charles Owen Rice
 Charles Taze Russell – founder of Watch Tower Bible & Tract Society
 R. C. Sproul – theologian
 Thomas J. Tobin – auxiliary bishop of Pittsburgh, bishop of Youngstown OH, and current bishop of Providence, Rhode Island
 Cardinal Donald Wuerl – eleventh bishop of the Roman Catholic Diocese of Pittsburgh, current Archbishop of Washington
 David Zubik – twelfth and current bishop of the Roman Catholic Diocese of Pittsburgh

Science and research

 Ross Allen – herpetologist
 Frederick S. Billig – scramjet pioneer
 Daniel Chamovitz – biologist,  author of What a Plant Knows, and President of Ben Gurion University of the Negev
 Yuan Chang – virologist, co-discoverer of causes of several viral cancers, including Kaposi's sarcoma
 Norman Christ – physicist
 Childs Frick
 George Otto Gey – scientist who propagated the HeLa cell line
 William Jacob Holland – entomologist and chancellor of the Western University of Pennsylvania
 Randy Pausch – founder of Alice, and man behind the Last Lecture
 David M. Pozar – electrical engineer and academician
 Jonas Salk – physician, inventor of first polio vaccine
 Alex Shigo – arboriculturist and horticulturist
 Clifford Shull – Nobel Prize winner
 Herbert A. Simon – Carnegie Mellon University professor; winner of Nobel Prize for Economics
 Thomas Starzl – pioneering transplant surgeon in liver and multiorgan transplantation
 Jesse Steinfeld – United States Surgeon General under Nixon
 Otto Stern – German-American physicist and Nobel laureate, known for his studies of molecular beams; Carnegie Institute of Technology professor
 Nicholas E. Wagman 
 Sandra Welner (1958–2001) – physician, advocate for disabled women's healthcare
 Jerome Wolken (1917–1999) – biophysicist
 Jamie Zawinski 
 Jonathan Zittrain – professor of Internet law and computer science at Harvard
 Vladimir Zworykin – engineer and inventor, developed an early form of television; the IEEE presents a Vladimir Zworykin Award for outstanding contributions to development of television technology

Military

18th-century leaders

 Ebenezer Denny – 10th Adjutant General of the U.S. Army

19th-century leaders

 John M. Corse
 Benjamin Grierson – Civil War and Buffalo Soldier
 Alexander Hays – Brigadier General*, repulsed Pickett's Charge at Gettysburg
 Francis J. Herron
 Alexander Murray – Admiral
 James Scott Negley – Major General Civil War hero of Murfreesboro
 Thomas A. Rowley (1808–92) – Brigadier-general; Gettysburg; Civil War
 Jacob B. Sweitzer – General* Civil War, led major offensives at Gettysburg
 Samuel Baldwin Marks Young

20th-century leaders

 Joseph R. Lamonde
 Manus MacCloskey – Brigadier General
 Samuel Baldwin Marks Young – first Chief of Staff of the Army

21st-century leaders

 Michael Hayden – USAF ****, Director of NSA, CIA
 Harry E. Miller Jr. – major general who commanded the 42nd Infantry Division

Medal winners: Mexican conflict

 Charles Bishop
 Robert Semple

Medal winners: Civil War

 Charles Higby 
 Alexander Kelly 
 Alfred L. Pearson – Medal of Honor
 James Schoonmaker

Medal winners: World War II

 Arthur V. Ely 
 Charles E. Kelly 
 Archibald Mathies

Medal winners: Vietnam

 William D. Morgan
 William R. Prom

Astronauts

 Jay Apt – astronaut and professor
 Mike Fincke – Colonel, United States Air Force
 Terry Hart – Lieutenant Colonel, United States Air Force
 James Irwin – Apollo Lunar Module pilot of Apollo 15 and eighth person to walk on the Moon

Other military

 Adrian Cronauer – soldier, radio personality, subject of Good Morning, Vietnam
 Charles Graner – U.S. Army reservist convicted of prisoner abuse in connection with 2003–2004 Abu Ghraib prisoner abuse scandal

Government

Governors and mayors

 Bob Cranmer – Allegheny County Commissioner
 Justin Fairfax – Lieutenant Governor of Virginia
 Bob Filner  – San Diego Mayor 
 John F. Forward Sr. – 12th mayor of San Diego
 John F. Forward Jr. – 21st mayor of San Diego
 Barbara Hafer – first female Allegheny County Commissioner
 E. W. Marland – Governor of Oklahoma
 Elliot S. N. Morgan – Wyoming governor
 Janet Napolitano – Arizona governor
 Tom Ridge  – Governor 1995–2001; first Secretary of Homeland Security
 John K. Tener  – Governor, former MLB pitcher
 Dick Thornburgh – Governor 1979–87; U.S. Attorney General 1987–91
 Tom Vilsack – Iowa Governor, 1999–2007; Agriculture Secretary, 2009–2017

Congressmen and senators

 John Dalzell – Congressman 1887–1913; Chairman of the Ways and Means committee 1898–1913
 Harmar Denny – Congressman 1825–37
 Bob Filner – California Congressman 1993–2012
 Orrin Hatch – Utah Senator, 1977–2019
 John Heinz – Congressman 71–77, Senator 1977–91
 Thomas Marshall Howe – Congressman 1851–55
 John Kasich – Ohio Congressman 1983–2001, Governor 2011–2019
 Philander C. Knox – Senator 1901–04, 1917–21, United States Attorney General from 1901–04, Sec. of State from 1909–13
 Robert McKnight – Congressman 1859–63
 George T. Oliver – Senator 1909–17
 Rand Paul – Kentucky Senator 2011–present, Tea Party leader
 Ron Paul – Texas Congressman, presidential candidate
 David A. Reed – Senator
 Rick Santorum – Congressman 1991–95, Senator 1995–2007
 Claudine Schneider – Congresswoman Rhode Island 1981–91

Jurists

 Max Baer – Pennsylvania Supreme Court 2003–
 Derrick Bell – law professor
 Robert Bork – Supreme Court nominee, and acting AG
 George Dallas – Federal Court of Appeals 1892–1909
 Michael Fisher – Federal Appeals 2003–
 Albert Gordon – advocate for gay rights
 Ken Gormley 
 Philip Heymann – served in Carter and Clinton administrations
 William G. Hundley – prosecutor and criminal defense attorney
 Linda Kelly – Pennsylvania Attorney General
 Rolf Larsen – State Supreme Court Justice
 Donald J. Lee – Federal 1989–2000
 Timothy K. Lewis – Federal 1991–92, Appeals 1992–99
 Carol Los Mansmann – Federal 1982–85, Appeals 1985–2002
 Wilson McCandless – U.S. Judge
 Joan Melvin – Pennsylvania Supreme Court 2009–
 John Lester Miller – 1954–71
 Michael Angelo Musmanno – PA Supreme Court and Nuremberg tribunal
 Arthur Schwab – U.S. Judge 2002–present
 George Shiras – U.S. Supreme Court
 Sara Soffel – first woman to serve as a judge in Pennsylvania
 William Alvah Stewart – Federal 1951–53
 Hubert Irving Teitelbaum – 1970–1985
 W. H. Seward Thomson Federal – 1914–28
 Gerald Tjoflat – Appeals 1975–present
 Jay Waldman – Federal 1988–2003
 Joseph F. Weis, Jr. – Federal 1970–73, Appeals 1973–88
 James Scott Young – Federal 1908–14
 Donald Emil Ziegler – Federal 1978–2003

CIA and defense administrators
 Victoria "Torie" Clarke – Assistant Secretary of Defense for Public Affairs under George W. Bush
 Michael Hayden – CIA director 2006–09

White House cabinet

 James J. Davis – Secretary of Labor under presidents Harding, Coolidge, and Hoover
 Walter Forward – United States Secretary of the Treasury under John Tyler, 1841–1843
 Albert Gallatin – Treasury Secretary
 Paul H. O'Neill – 72nd United States Secretary of the Treasury
 Edwin Stanton – Secretary of War under President Lincoln
 Judge William Wilkins – Secretary of War under President Tyler

Ambassadors

 Homer S. Ferguson – Philippines
 Walter Forward – Denmark
 Mark Gilbert – New Zealand; also Major League Baseball player
 George W. Guthrie – Japan
 William W. Irwin – Denmark
 Andrew Mellon – Great Britain 1932–33
 Alexander Pollock Moore – Spain and Peru
 Dan Rooney – Ireland 2009–present
 Edith S. Sampson – first African-American in the U.N. (1950–53) and NATO (1961–62)
 Adolph W. Schmidt – Canada 1969–74
 Phillips Talbot – Greece

State legislators

 Paul P. Boswell – physician, member of  the Illinois House of Representatives
 David Dank – member of the Oklahoma House of Representatives since 2007
 John R. Jones – member of the Wisconsin State Assembly
 Andrew P. Kealy  – member of the Wisconsin State Assembly
 Emily Kinkead - member of Pennsylvania House of Representatives
 Alexander McDonald Thomson – Speaker of the Wisconsin State Assembly

Suffragists and other women's rights activists

 Euphemia Bakewell
 Jennie E. Kennedy
 Lucy Kennedy Miller
 Jennie Bradley Roessing
 Eliza Kennedy Smith

Other administrators and advisors

 Rachel Foster Avery
 John Brabender 
 Murray Chotiner 
 Patrick R. Donahoe 
 Tony Fratto – Deputy Press Secretary 2006–09
 Elsie Hillman – former Republican National Committeewoman from Pennsylvania

Law enforcement

 Vic Cianca – Pittsburgh traffic cop made famous by Johnny Carson, Candid Camera and Flashdance
 Thomas Delahanty – police officer who took a bullet in President Ronald Reagan's 1981 assassination attempt; declared a hero and awarded a medal for bravery

Other

 Richard Baumhammers – Spree killer
 Lawrence Bittaker – One of the two "Toolbox Killers"

See also
 List of people from Pennsylvania

References

Pittsburgh, Pennsylvania
Pennsylvania culture
People from Pittsburgh
Pittsburgh-related lists